Bjørn Hvinden (born 6 December 1949) is a Norwegian sociologist. He is a research professor and managing director of Norwegian Social Research.

He has formerly been director of the Nordic Centre of Excellence in Welfare Research "Reassessing the Nordic Welfare Model", a cooperation between universities and research institutions in all the Nordic countries. He was Professor of Sociology at the Norwegian University of Science and Technology from 1995 to 2007. His research fields are social policy, disability and international migration.

He has been a visiting professor/visiting scholar at the universities in Edinburgh, Umeå, Helsinki, Bremen and Uppsala. He was elected a member of the Royal Norwegian Society of Sciences and Letters in 2006.

Publications
Citizenship in Nordic Welfare States. Dynamics of choice, duties and participation in a changing Europe, 2007
Nordic welfare states in the European context, 2001
Virker velferdsstaten?, 2001
Romanifolket og det norske samfunnet, 2001
Nordic Social Policy, 1999

References

Norwegian sociologists
Norwegian Social Research people
Living people
1949 births